The 2006 Svenska Cupen Final took place on November 11, 2006 at Råsunda Stadium in Solna, Sweden. It was contested by Allsvenskan teams Gefle IF and Helsingborgs IF. It was Gefle's first final of all time. Helsingborg, who had won the cup two times before the match, played their latest final in 1998.

In this final, Helsingborg were the sharper team and won 2-0, thanks to goals by Luton Shelton and Babis Stefanidis.

Road to the Final

 Square brackets [ ] represent the opposition's division.

Match details

See also
2006 Svenska Cupen

References

External links
Svenska Cupen at svenskfotboll.se

2006
Cupen
Gefle IF matches
Helsingborgs IF matches
Football in Stockholm
November 2006 sports events in Europe